Nukri Revishvili (born 2 March 1987) is a Georgian former footballer.

Revishvili made his international debut on 2 successive games in 2006 FIFA World Cup qualification (UEFA).

After the qualifying, he also played two friendlies in 2005, two in 2006 and one friendly in 2007.

Club statistics

As of 11 August 2013

References

External links
 
 
 
 Nukri Revishvili at Sport
 

1987 births
Living people
People from Kutaisi
Footballers from Georgia (country)
Expatriate footballers from Georgia (country)
Georgia (country) international footballers
Georgia (country) under-21 international footballers
FC Tosno players
FC Mordovia Saransk players
FC Rubin Kazan players
FC Anzhi Makhachkala players
FC Krasnodar players
FC Dila Gori players
FC Dinamo Tbilisi players
FC Metalurgi Rustavi players
Erovnuli Liga players
Russian Premier League players
Expatriate footballers in Russia
Association football goalkeepers